The obelisk at Prague Castle is a granite monolith and World War I memorial designed by Jože Plečnik, installed at Prague Castle in Prague, Czech Republic.  It stands 16 meters high.  It is located in the Third Castle Courtyard.

The obelisk was donated by Tomáš Garrigue Masaryk.  It was erected in late 1928 to mark the tenth anniversary of the establishment of the First Czechoslovak Republic. The obelisk was originally to have been much larger, but while it was being transported to its intended location in 1928, it broke in two, and only part could be salvaged.

References

External links

 

Granite sculptures
Monuments and memorials in Prague
Obelisks
Outdoor sculptures in Prague
Prague Castle
World War I memorials